Atlanta rosea is a species of sea snail, a holoplanktonic marine gastropod mollusk in the family Atlantidae.

Richter (1993) confirmed the validity of this species on the basis of morphology and anatomical characteristics

Distribution
This species occurs in the Tyrrhenian Sea in Sicily and in the Ionian Sea.

References

External links
 Oliverio, Marco (2006). Gastropoda Prosobranchia Caenogastropoda, in: Revisione della Checklist della fauna marina italiana.

Atlantidae
Gastropods described in 1852